Jeremiah Gutjahr (born August 10, 1997) is an American former professional soccer player who played as a midfielder.

Early life

College & Youth
Gutjahr attended Indiana University, where he played college soccer as a defensive midfielder for the Hoosiers from 2016–2018, tallying a total of 2 goals and 3 assists in 71 appearances.

While at college, Gutjahr also appeared for USL PDL side Chicago Fire U-23 during their 2016 season.

Professional career

Chicago Fire
On January 22, 2019, Gutjahr signed a one-year contract with Chicago Fire as a Homegrown Player, with options for the 2019, 2020 and 2021 seasons. He was released by Chicago at the end of the 2020 season.

Indy Eleven
On March 15, 2021, Gutjahr signed with USL Championship side Indy Eleven. He made his debut for the club on May 1, 2021 against Birmingham Legion.

Retirement
He is now retired and working with Indiana University's Soccer front office.

Honors

United States U20
 CONCACAF Under-20 Championship (1): 2017

References

External links 
 

1997 births
Living people
American soccer players
Association football midfielders
Chicago Fire FC players
Chicago Fire U-23 players
Homegrown Players (MLS)
Indiana Hoosiers men's soccer players
Indy Eleven players
Major League Soccer players
USL Championship players
Soccer players from Indiana
Sportspeople from Bloomington, Indiana
USL League Two players
United States men's under-20 international soccer players